In the 1953–54 season, Internazionale competed in the domestic league as the defending champion.

Summary 
Inter started the season without Nyers, cut off from the club following a debate with chairman Masseroni about his salary. However, this did not seem to encumber play, resulting in a better season than the previous year. Nyers came back just before the Derby della Madonnina, and won 3–0 by his hat-trick. Six months later in the Derby d'Italia, Inter beat Juventus 6–0, which was crucial for the conquest of another Scudetto, leaving Juventus one point shy.

Squad 
Source:

The roles of the players are in brackets.

  Gino Armano (winger)
  Ivano Blason (full back)
  Sergio Brighenti (centre forward)
  Pietro Broccini (midfielder)
  Sebastiano Buzzin (midfielder)
  Osvaldo Fattori (midfielder)
  Giorgio Ghezzi (goalkeeper)
  Giovanni Giacomazzi (centre back)
  Attilio Giovannini (half back)
  Lino Grava (full back)
  Benito Lorenzi (centre forward)
  Bruno Mazza (midfielder)
  Lido Mazzoni (winger)
  Sergio Morin (midfielder)
  Maino Neri (midfielder)
  Fulvio Nesti (midfielder)
  István Nyers (centre forward)
  Bruno Padulazzi (full back)
  Lennart Skoglund (playmaker)
  Guido Vincenzi (full back)
  Luigi Zambaiti (centre forward)

Competitions

Serie A

League table

Matches

Statistics

Squad statistics

2 points were awarded for every win, so Inter collected 51 points instead 61.

Players statistics 
Source:

Appearances and goals are referred to domestic league:

Ghezzi (34/−32); Armano (33/13); Neri (32); Giacomazzi (29); Nesti (29/2); Lorenzi (28/12); Mazza (27/3); Skoglund (27/10); Giovannini (25); Padulazzi (25); Fattori (20/2); Vincenzi (18/1); Brighenti (15/9); Nyers (14/8); Buzzin (12/5); Broccini (4); Blason (1); Zambaiti (1).

References

See also 
 Inter Milan

Inter Milan seasons
Internazionale
Italian football championship-winning seasons